The 2020 Rutgers Scarlet Knights football team represented Rutgers University during the 2020 NCAA Division I FBS football season. The Scarlet Knights played their home games at SHI Stadium in Piscataway, New Jersey, and competed as members of the East Division of the Big Ten Conference. They were led by 12th-year head coach Greg Schiano, in the first season of his second stint with Rutgers.

On August 11, 2020, the Big Ten Conference canceled all fall sports competitions due to the COVID-19 pandemic. On September 16, the Big Ten reinstated the season, announcing an eight-game season beginning on October 24.

Previous season

The Scarlet Knights finished the 2019 season 2–10, 0–9 in Big Ten play to finish in last place in the East Division.

Schedule
Rutgers had games scheduled against Monmouth, Syracuse, and Temple, but canceled these games on July 9 due to the Big Ten Conference's decision to play a conference-only schedule due to the COVID-19 pandemic.

Roster and Coaches

* Jim Paganos was unable to coach in 2020 due to knee replacement surgery. Charlie Noonan replaced him as the interim defensive line coach.

References

Rutgers
Rutgers Scarlet Knights football seasons
Rutgers Scarlet Knights football